Shinmaruyama Dam is a gravity dam located in Gifu Prefecture in Japan. The dam is used for flood control and power production. The catchment area of the dam is 2409 km2. The dam impounds about 368  ha of land when full and can store 131350 thousand cubic meters of water. The construction of the dam was started on 1980.

References

Dams in Gifu Prefecture